Monumentour was a co-headlining concert tour by American rock bands Fall Out Boy and Paramore in support of their latest albums, Save Rock and Roll (2013) and Paramore (2013). It was supported by New Politics as the opening band. The tour was set to play a total of forty-four concerts over the course four months in North America. The tour was announced in January 2014, and was later expanded in April 2014.
It was the first time the bands toured together, hence the name Monumentour.

Setlist

{{hidden
| headercss = background: #ccccff; font-size: 100%; width: 65%;
| contentcss = text-align: left; font-size: 100%; width: 75%;
| header = Paramore
| content =
"Still Into You"
"That's What You Get"
"For a Pessimist, I'm Pretty Optimistic"
"Ignorance"
"Pressure"
"Decode"
"The Only Exception"
"Last Hope"
9th Song Changes 
"Misery Business"
"Let the Flames Begin"
"Part II"
"Proof"
Encore
  "Ain't It Fun"
}}
Notes 
Paramore setlist change
"Emergency" was performed as the ninth song in Hartford, Connecticut on June 19, 2014, the June 25, 2014 show in Toronto, Canada, Tampa, Florida, on July 26 (this was because it was the ninth anniversary of the band's first album All We Know Is Falling and this song was on the album), and the August 31, 2014, show in Scranton, Pennsylvania.
"Feeling Sorry" was performed as the ninth song in Wantagh, New York on June 21, 2014.
"Born For This" was performed as the ninth song in Mansfield, Massachusetts on June 22, 2014, the June 27, 2014 show in Camden, New Jersey, and the July 2, show in Darien Center, New York.
"Brick by Boring Brick" was performed as the ninth song in Saratoga Springs, New York on June 24, 2014, Holmdel Township, New Jersey on June 28, 2014, in Clarkston, Michigan on July 8, 2014, in Tinley Park, Illinois on July 11, in Hershey, Pennsylvania on July 19, 2014, in Raleigh, North Carolina on July 22, 2014, Virginia Beach, Virginia on July 29, 2014, Atlanta, Georgia on July 30, 2014, Phoenix, Arizona on August 8, 2014, Orem, Utah on August 13, 2014, and in Morrison, Colorado on August 12, 2014.
"Fast In My Car" was performed as the ninth song in Noblesville, Indiana on July 9, 2014.

{{hidden
| headercss = background: #ccccff; font-size: 100%; width: 65%;
| contentcss = text-align: left; font-size: 100%; width: 75%;
| header = Fall Out Boy
| content =
"The Phoenix"
"The Take Over, the Breaks Over"
"A Little Less Sixteen Candles, a Little More "Touch Me""
"This Ain't a Scene, It's an Arms Race"
"Alone Together"
"Death Valley"
"Sugar, We're Goin Down"
"Miss Missing You" 
Drum solo 
(Slayer's Raining Blood intro, Andy and Patrick dueling)
"Dance, Dance"
"Young Volcanoes"
"Just One Yesterday"
"Grand Theft Autumn/Where Is Your Boy"
"We Are the Champions" 
"Save Rock and Roll"
"I Don't Care"
"My Songs Know What You Did in the Dark (Light Em Up)"
Encore
"Thnks fr th Mmrs"
"Saturday"
}}

Tour dates
According to PollStar, the Monumentour grossed about US$8.9 million with an average show earnings of about $325,000. The first three dates alone pulled in $3.3 million.

External links

References

2014 concert tours
Co-headlining concert tours
Fall Out Boy
Paramore concert tours